Natalia Anatolyevna Kutuzova (born March 18, 1975, in Moscow) is a Russian water polo player, who won the bronze medal at the 2000 Summer Olympics. She was a part of the  team at the World Championships, most recently at the 2009 World Aquatics Championships.

See also
 List of Olympic medalists in water polo (women)

References

External links
 

1975 births
Living people
Russian female water polo players
Olympic water polo players of Russia
Water polo players at the 2000 Summer Olympics
Olympic bronze medalists for Russia
Olympic medalists in water polo
Medalists at the 2000 Summer Olympics